The 1952–53 Rugby Union County Championship was the 53rd edition of England's premier rugby union club competition at the time.

Yorkshire won the competition for the tenth time (but the first since 1928) after defeating East Midlands in the final.

Final

See also
 English rugby union system
 Rugby union in England

References

Rugby Union County Championship
County Championship (rugby union) seasons